1701 Pennsylvania Avenue is a high-rise office building in Washington, D.C., United States. Construction of the building was completed in 1962. The architect of the recent renovation of the building was Fox Architects, Inc. The building serves as an office building for Washington. The building also hosts the embassy for the Republic of Palau.

See also
 List of tallest buildings in Washington, D.C.

References

Office buildings completed in 1962
Skyscraper office buildings in Washington, D.C.
1962 establishments in Washington, D.C.